Sir Cornelius Alvin Smith  (born 7 April 1937) is a Bahamian politician and diplomat. 

He became the eleventh governor-general of the Bahamas on 28 June 2019.

Biography 
Smith was one of the first members of the Free National Movement upon its foundation in the early 1970s, and served in the legislature representing Marco City constituency in Grand Bahama starting in 1982, and was re-elected three times. Smith served as the Minister of Education from 1992 to 1995, Minister of Public Safety and Immigration from 1995 to 1997, Minister of Tourism from 1997 to 2000, and Minister of Transport and Local Government from 2000 to 2002.

He also previously was Ambassador to the United States starting on his appointment on 24 September 2007, as well as Ambassador/Permanent Representative to the Organization of American States and Non-Resident Ambassador to Mexico, Malaysia, Colombia, Panama, Costa Rica, El Salvador, Guatemala, Honduras and Nicaragua. 

In 2018, he was sworn in as the deputy Governor General.

References 

1937 births
Living people
Knights Grand Cross of the Order of St Michael and St George
21st-century Bahamian politicians
Governors-General of the Bahamas